Eddi Reader is the second studio album by Eddi Reader released in the United Kingdom on 20 June 1994.

The album was recorded in America with producer Greg Penny (k.d. lang's producer on Ingenue), and was the first to feature songs written and co-written with future regular cohort Boo Hewerdine. It also featured four songs written by ex Fairground Attraction member Mark Nevin.

With major label backing and extensive radio & MTV-play for the single "Patience of Angels" it is Reader's most successful chart album to date, going Top 40 in the UK in its first week of release.

On the strength of this success, Reader received Best British Female at the Brit Awards the following year.

Two additional singles were released: "Joke (I'm Laughing)" and "Dear John". The latter was co-written by Kirsty MacColl and originally intended for her 1993 album Titanic Days. However MacColl was going through a divorce at the time and felt the song was too painful to release and offered the track to Reader. It would later resurface as a demo recording on the 2005 re-released Titanic Days. Reader has worked with Kirsty's half brothers Neill and Calum MacColl.

Track listing

Personnel
Eddi Reader – vocals, backing vocals, tambourine
Teddy Borowiecki – keyboards, accordion, guitar
Dean Parks – guitars, guitar percussion
David Piltch – bass
Curt Bisquera – drums, percussion
Roy Dodds – drums
Mark E. Nevin – guitars
Greg Penny – percussion
John Ingoldsby – backing vocals
Katia Lempkowicz – backing vocals

Charts

Certifications

References

1994 albums